Kuno National Park is a national park and Wildlife Sanctuary in Madhya Pradesh, India. It derives its name from Kuno River. In 2018, it was given the status of a national park. It is part of the Khathiar-Gir dry deciduous forests ecoregion.

History 
In the 1990s, it was selected as a possible site to implement the Asiatic Lion Reintroduction Project, which aimed at establishing a second lion population in India.
Between 1998 and 2003, about 1,650 inhabitants of 24 villages were resettled to sites outside the protected area.
Most of the inhabitants were Saharia tribal people. The villages were also home to Jatav, Brahmin, Gujjar, Kushwaha and Yadav people.
An area of  surrounding the wildlife sanctuary was added as a buffer zone to human settlements. In 2009, Kuno Wildlife Sanctuary was also proposed as a possible site for cheetah reintroduction in India, which has begun with eight of the animals released in September 2022.  

Gujarat state had resisted the relocation of lion, since it would make the Gir Sanctuary lose its status as the world's only home of the Asiatic lion. In April 2013, the Indian Supreme Court ordered Gujarat to send some of their Gir lions to Madhya Pradesh to establish a second population. The court had given wildlife authorities six months to complete the transfer.

In January 2022, environment minister Bhupender Yadav launched the action plan for reintroducing cheetahs in India, starting with Kuno national park.
In 2022, the Indian government drafted a 25-year plan for Lion relocation within Gujarat state and not in other states. The Gujarat government has not carried out the Supreme Court's order since 2013 and resisted the relocation of lions to other states. According to Bhopal-based environmentalist Ajay Dubey plans to reintroduce African cheetahs in Kuno National Park is another way to escape the transfer of lions to the Kuno National Park.
On 17 September 2022, five female and three male cheetahs aged 4 to 6 years arrived in Kuno National Park from Namibia.

Wildlife

Flora 
The vegetation of the protected area includes Anogeissus pendula forest and scrub, Boswellia and Butea forest, dry savanna forest and grassland and tropical riverine forest. The dominant tree species are Acacia catechu, Salai Boswellia serrata, Tendu Diospyros melanoxylon, Palash Butea monosperma, Dhok Anogeissus latifolia, Acacia leucophloea, Ziziphus mauritiana and Ziziphus xylopyrus. Prominent shrub species include Grewia flavescens, Helicteres isora, Hopbush viscosa, Vitex negundo. Grass species include Heteropogon contortus, Apluda mutica, Aristida hystrix, Themeda quadrivalvis, Cenchrus ciliaris and Desmostachya bipinnata. Senna tora and Argemone mexicana are also common.

Fauna

Mammals
The main predators occurring in the protected area are Indian leopard, Southeast African cheetah, jungle cat, sloth bear, dhole, Indian wolf, Indian jackal, striped hyena and Bengal fox. Ungulates include chital, sambar, nilgai, chousingha, chinkara, blackbuck and wild boar. More than 1,900 feral zebu cattle were estimated to occur in 2008, whereas density of wild ungulates was considered too low to sustain an introduced lion population at the time. Indian grey mongoose, ruddy mongoose, small Indian mongoose, honey badger, gray langur, Indian crested porcupine and Indian hare have also been recorded.

Reptiles 
Reptiles present here includes mugger crocodile, gharial, Bengal monitor and Indian softshell turtle.

Birds
A total of 129 bird species were sighted during a survey in spring 2007. Indian white-backed vulture, long-billed vulture, red-headed vulture, Egyptian vulture, crested serpent-eagle, short-toed snake eagle, Bonelli's eagle, white-eyed buzzard, changeable hawk-eagle, brown fish owl and spotted owlet are resident raptors. Western marsh-harrier, pied harrier, Montagu's harrier, steppe eagle, osprey, common kestrel, short-eared owl, Demoiselle crane and common crane are winter visitors.

Avifauna also includes black-shouldered kite, painted spurfowl, ruddy shelduck, Indian peafowl, grey francolin, Eurasian nightjar, jungle nightjar, Indian nightjar, painted sandgrouse, woolly-necked stork, great stone-curlew, Sirkeer malkoha, Indian golden oriole, black-rumped flameback, bay-backed shrike and Indian paradise flycatcher.

See also 
 In-situ conservation
 Ex-situ conservation
 Wildlife conservation

References

External links 

 "Kuno Wildlife Sanctuary"
 AAj Tak Video News Report in Hindi available on Youtube: Gir lions in palpur kuno century report rajesh badal.mp4 by Rajesh Badal uploaded on 14 Feb 2011
 Video on Youtube: India Cheetah Re-introduction. Uploaded by ccfcheetah on 19 Jan 2012; The Cheetah Conservation Fund CCF has been working on and advisory capacity with the Wildlife Trust of India and India's authorities to discuss the best strategies for re-introducing cheetahs in India. For more information visit www.cheetah.org

Asiatic Lion Reintroduction Project
Cheetah reintroduction in India
Khathiar-Gir dry deciduous forests
National parks in Madhya Pradesh
Sheopur district
Protected areas established in 2018
2018 establishments in Madhya Pradesh